The province of Riau in Indonesia is divided into regencies which in turn are divided administratively into districts 

The districts of Riau, with the regency each falls into, are as follows:

Bagan Sinembah, Rokan Hilir
Bangkinang Barat, Kampar
Bangkinang Seberang, Kampar
Bangkinang, Kampar
Bangko Pusako, Rokan Hilir
Bangko, Rokan Hilir
Bangun Purba, Rokan Hulu
Bantan, Bengkalis
Batang Cenaku, Indragiri Hulu
Batang Gansal, Indragiri Hulu
Batang Tuaka, Sungai Piring (ibu kota/capital city), Indragiri Hilir
Batu Hampar, Rokan Hilir
Benai, Kuantan Singingi
Bengkalis, Bengkalis
Bukit Batu, Bengkalis
Bukit Kapur, Dumai
Bukit Kapur, Siak
Bukit Raya, Pekanbaru
Bunga Raya, Siak
Bunut, Pelalawan
Cerenti, Kuantan Singingi
Dayun, Siak
Dumai Barat, Dumai
Dumai Barat, Siak
Dumai Timur, Dumai
Dumai Timur, Siak
Enok, Enok (ibu kota/capital city), Indragiri Hilir
Gaung Anak Serka, Teluk Pinang (ibu kota/capital city), Indragiri Hilir
Gaung, Kuala Lahang (ibu kota/capital city), Indragiri Hilir
Gunung Sahilan, Kampar
Gunung Toar, Kuantan Singingi
Hulu Kuantan, Kuantan Singingi
Inuman, Kuantan Singingi
Kabun, Rokan Hulu
Kampar Kiri Hilir, Kampar
Kampar Kiri Hulu, Kampar
Kampar Kiri, Kampar
Kampar Timur, Kampar
Kampar Utara, Kampar
Kampar, Kampar
Kandis, Siak
Kateman, Sungai Guntung (ibu kota/capital city), Indragiri Hilir
Kelayang, Indragiri Hulu
Kemuning, Selensen (ibu kota/capital city), Indragiri Hilir
Kepenuhan, Rokan Hulu
Kerinci Kanan, Siak
Keritang, Kotabaru (ibu kota/capital city), Indragiri Hilir
Kerumutan, Pelalawan
Koto Gasip, Siak
Kuala Cenaku, Indragiri Hiir
Kuala Indragiri, Sapat (ibu kota/capital city), Indragiri Hilir
Kuala Kampar, Pelalawan
Kuantan Hilir, Kuantan Singingi
Kuantan Mudik, Kuantan Singingi
Kuantan Tengah, Kuantan Singingi
Kubu, Rokan Hilir
Kuntodarussalam, Rokan Hulu
Langgam, Pelalawan
Lima Puluh, Pekanbaru
Limapuluh, Pekanbaru
Lirik, Indragiri Hulu
Logas Tanah Darat, Kuantan Singingi
Lubuk Dalam, Siak
Mandah, Khairiah Mandah (ibu kota/capital city), Indragiri Hilir
Mandau, Bengkalis
Marpoyan Damai, Pekanbaru
Medang Kampai, Dumai
Medang Kampai, Siak
Merbau, Bengkalis
Merbau, Kepulauan Meranti
Minas, Siak
Pangean, Kuantan Singingi
Pangkalan Kerinci, Pelalawan
Pangkalan Kuras, Pelalawan
Pangkalan Lesung, Pelalawan
Pasir Limau Kapas, Rokan Hilir
Payung Sekaki, Pekanbaru
Pekanbaru Kota, Pekanbaru
Pelalawan, Pelalawan
Pelangiran, Pelangiran (ibu kota/capital city), Indragiri Hilir
Perhentian Raja, Kampar
Pinggir, Bengkalis
Pujud, Rokan Hilir
Pulau Burung, Pulau Burung (ibu kota/capital city), Indragiri Hilir
Rambah Hilir, Rokan Hulu
Rambah Samo, Rokan Hulu
Rambah, Rokan Hulu
Rangsang Barat, Bengkalis
Rangsang Barat, Kepulauan Meranti
Rangsang, Bengkalis
Rangsang, Kepulauan Meranti
Rantau Kopar, Rokan Hilir
Rengat, Indragiri Hulu
Reteh, Pulau Kijang (ibu kota/capital city), Indragiri Hilir
Rimba Melintang, Rokan Hilir
Rokan IV Koto, Rokan Hulu
Rumbai Pesisir, Pekanbaru
Rumbai, Pekanbaru
Rumbio Jaya, Kampar
Rupat Utara, Bengkalis
Rupat, Bengkalis
Sail, Pekanbaru
Salo, Kampar
Seberida, Indragiri Hulu
Senapelan, Pekanbaru
Siak Hulu, Kampar
Siak Kecil, Bengkalis
Siak, Siak
Simpang Kanan, Rokan Hilir
Sinaboi, Rokan Hilir
Singingi Hilir, Kuantan Singingi
Singingi, Kuantan Singingi
Sukajadi, Pekanbaru
Sungai Apit, Siak
Sungai Mandau, Siak
Sungai Sembilan, Dumai
Sungai Sembilan, Siak
Tambang, Kampar
Tampan, Pekanbaru
Tanah Merah, Kuala Enok (ibu kota/capital city), Indragiri Hilir
Tanah Putih Tanjung Melawan, Rokan Hilir
Tanah Putih, Rokan Hilir
Tandun, Rokan Hulu
Tapung Hilir, Kampar
Tapung Hulu, Kampar
Tapung, Kampar
Tebing Tinggi Barat, Bengkalis
Tebing Tinggi Barat, Kepulauan Meranti
Tebing Tinggi, Bengkalis
Tebing Tinggi, Kepulauan Meranti
Teluk Balengkong, Teluk Balengkong (ibu kota/capital city), Indragiri Hilir
Teluk Meranti, Pelalawan
Tembilahan Hulu, Tembilahan Hulu (ibu kota/capital city), Indragiri Hilir
Tembilahan, Tembilahan Kota (ibu kota/capital city), Indragiri Hilir
Tembusai Utara, Rokan Hulu
Tembusai, Rokan Hulu
Tempuling, Sungai Salak (ibu kota/capital city), Indragiri Hilir
Tualang, Siak
Ujung Batu, Rokan Hulu
Ukui, Pelalawan
XIII Koto Kampar, Kampar

 
Riau